LPC may refer to:

Science and technology
 Linear predictive coding, a method used in audio signal processing and speech processing
 Leaf protein concentrate, a concentrated form of the proteins found in the leaves of plants
 Long period comet, a comet classification
 Lysophosphatidylcholine, chemical compounds
 Late positive component, a brain potential
  (Latin for coal tar solution)

Computing
 LPC (programming language), the programming language of LPMuds
 Local Procedure Call, in Microsoft's Windows NT operating systems
 Low Pin Count, a computer bus technology
 Lync Persistent Chat, a Microsoft Lync feature
 NXP LPC, a family of 32-bit microcontroller integrated circuits

Organizations
 Lahore Press Club, a press association in Pakistan
 Lambda Pi Chi, a U.S. sorority
 Las Piñas College, Philippines
 Liberal Party of Canada, a Canadian political party
 Li Po Chun United World College, a Hong Kong college
 Little People of Canada, for people of small stature
 London Philharmonic Choir, a British choir
 Lucky People Center, a Swedish electronic music collective
 Luethi-Peterson Camps, an international summer camp program
 New York City Landmarks Preservation Commission, the agency administering the city's Landmarks Preservation Law

Other uses
 Lompoc Airport (FAA LID), US
 Legal Practice Course, the vocational stage for becoming a solicitor in England and Wales
 Liable to become a Public Charge (LPC), in US immigration
 Longmont Potion Castle (born 1972), surrealist prank call artist
 Licensed professional counselor, a professional credential

See also